The 2006 Astro Wah Lai Toi Drama Awards, presented by Astro in Malaysia, was an awards ceremony that recognised the best Hong Kong television programmes that aired on Malaysia's Astro Wah Lai Toi in 2006. The ceremony was televised live on Astro's Cantonese channel, Astro Wah Lai Toi.

The ceremony took place on 20 January 2007 at the Arena of Stars in Genting Highlands, Pahang, Malaysia. Winners were 100% based on results through popular voting, which commenced on 16 December 2006. Wars of In-Laws was the night's biggest winner, taking home five awards including My Favourite Drama and My Favourite Actress.

Winners and nominees
Top five nominees are in bold.

References

TVB original programming
2007 television awards
2007 in Malaysian television
2007 in Hong Kong television
Genting Highlands